Volobilis biplaga is a moth of the family Pyralidae first described by Francis Walker in 1863. It is found in Taiwan and Sri Lanka.

Subspecies
Volobilis biplaga taiwanella Shibuya, 1928

References

Moths of Asia
Moths described in 1863
Phycitini